Drissa Traouré (born September 17, 1968) is an Ivorian sprint canoer who competed in the early 1990s. At the 1992 Summer Olympics in Barcelona, he was eliminated in the repechages of the K-2 500 m event.

External links
Sports-Reference.com profile

1968 births
Canoeists at the 1992 Summer Olympics
Ivorian male canoeists
Living people
Olympic canoeists of Ivory Coast